Hannah Nielsen (born 28 November 1987 in Adelaide, Australia) is the current head coach of the University of Michigan women’s lacrosse team. She was formerly the first women's lacrosse assistant coach at the University of Colorado. Originally from the Brighton Lacrosse Club in Adelaide (also the home club of Jen Adams), Nielsen played for the Northwestern University Wildcats, and won four national championships as a player.  She was a three-time All-American, and is a winner of both the Tewaaraton Trophy and Honda Sports Award in her junior and senior seasons. She holds NCAA records for career assists, assists in a season, and assists in single game.

Also a member of the Australia women's national lacrosse team, Nielsen was a member of the Australian U19 team (2003 & 2007) as well as the 2005 World Cup-winning senior team, and was selected as an All-Star player in both the 2009 and 2013 World Cups.

Head coaching record

College

†NCAA canceled 2020 collegiate activities due to the COVID-19 virus.

References

1987 births
Australian lacrosse players
Northwestern Wildcats women's lacrosse players
Penn State Nittany Lions women's lacrosse coaches
Towson Tigers women's lacrosse coaches
Colorado Buffaloes women's lacrosse coaches
Northwestern Wildcats women's lacrosse coaches
Michigan Wolverines women's lacrosse coaches
Sportswomen from South Australia
Living people
Women's lacrosse players
Sportspeople from Adelaide
Big Ten Athlete of the Year winners